Sheep Mountain is a summit in the U.S. state of Nevada.

Sheep Mountain was so named on account of wild sheep once seen in the area.

References

Mountains of Nye County, Nevada